Feminist Theory: From Margin to Center is a 1984 book about feminist theory by bell hooks. The book confirmed her importance as a leader in radical feminist thought. The "margin" in the title refers to hooks' description of black women as existing on the margins and their lives hidden from mainstream American society as well as not being part of mainstream feminist theory. The book was published in French in 2017.

In the Preface to the New edition of the book, hooks outlines how she wrote the book as a response to the need for theory that took into account gender, race and class. A need that came from the women's liberation movement being primarily structured around issues relevant to white women with class privilege.

In the first chapter hooks critiques Betty Friedan's The Feminine Mystique (1963) as being a limited one dimensional perspective on women's reality even if it is a useful discussion about the impact of sexist discrimination on a select group of women, college-educated, middle- and upper-class married white women, namely housewives. hooks argues that Friedan does not include the lives, experiences or needs of women without men, women without children, women without homes, non-white women or poor women.

hooks uses the term white-supremacist capitalist patriarchy as a lens through which to both critique various aspects of American culture and to offer potential solutions to the problems she explores. hooks addresses topics including the goals of feminist movement, the role of men in feminist struggle, the relevance of pacifism, solidarity among women, and the nature of revolution. hooks can be identified in her discussions of these topics as a radical feminist because of her arguments that the system itself is corrupt and that achieving equality in such a system is neither possible nor desirable.  She promotes instead a complete transformation of society and all of its institutions as a result of protracted struggle, envisioning a life-affirming, peaceful tomorrow.

References

External links
  Feminist Theory on Google books

1984 non-fiction books
American non-fiction books
Black feminist books
Books by bell hooks
English-language books
Multicultural feminism
Radical feminist books